Basil B. Bennett (November 30, 1894 – August 19, 1938) was an American athlete who competed mainly in the hammer throw. He competed for the United States in the 1920 Summer Olympics held in Antwerp, Belgium in the hammer throw where he won the Bronze medal.

He was born in Dudley, Illinois and died in Maywood, Illinois.

References

External links
profile

1894 births
1938 deaths
American male hammer throwers
Olympic bronze medalists for the United States in track and field
Athletes (track and field) at the 1920 Summer Olympics
Medalists at the 1920 Summer Olympics